Hellinsia caras is a moth of the family Pterophoridae. It is found in Ecuador and Peru.

The wingspan is 26–27 mm. The forewings are ochreous-white to silvery-white and the marking are brown. The hindwings and fringes are silvery white. Adults are on wing in March and October, at an altitude of 3,000 to 3,450 meters.

Etymology
In mediaeval times the Caras people were a tribe in Ecuador.

References

Moths described in 2011
caras
Moths of South America